The Punisher War Journal is an American comic book series published from 1988 to 1995 by Marvel Comics featuring the character Frank Castle, also known as the vigilante the Punisher. It was the first ever spin-off for the character and the first series of the title The Punisher War Journal. It lasted for 80 issues and featured varying artists, including early works of Jim Lee and writers, most notably Carl Potts who had worked as an editor on the main Punisher series before.

Background
The series was made due to the character's immense popularity at the time. Marvel had previously used the character in guest appearances to boost the sales of other titles, but decided to publish a second ongoing title for the Punisher which became this series. Mike Baron, the series' editor and one of the writers, expressed in a 1988 interview that the character's popularity came at a time when American citizens were especially angry with society's failure to punish evil.

Publication history

Plot
The series consists of several story arcs, including "An Eye For An Eye", "Firepower Among The Ruins", "The Sicilian Saga", "The Kamchatkan Konspiracy", "Pariah!" and "Last Entry" which were confined within the series itself and other arcs such as "Acts of Vengeance", "Dead Man's Hand" and "Suicide Run" which were part of larger Marvel events. The final arc, "Countdown" was a crossover between all the ongoing Punisher series at the time.

Reception
The series was hugely popular upon its original release. Because of the series success Marvel put together a promo tour for the creators of the books. They visited numerous comic book stores in California and Hawaii and interacted with the fans there. Its popularity also prompted Marvel to publish a third ongoing Punisher series named The Punisher War Zone. Though the popularity fell later in the run as it did with the two other Punisher titles at the time, The Punisher and War Zone due to extensive overexposure of the character at the time. The series greatly contributed to the characters independent success outside of being a supporting character. The series, especially Potts writing influenced Charles Forsman's series Revenger. The series featured the first meeting of Wolverine and the Punisher in issue 6, named "On The Track Of Unknown Animals", which was described by Blair Marnell of Comingsoon.net as a memorable meeting, and was voted as the 75th greatest issue of any Marvel series ever in 2001. Greg Burgas of Comic Book Resources praised Lee's artwork.

Content
While still under the comics code authority the series featured bodily violence which had not been previously used in Marvel comics publications. The series also featured more guns, explosions and highly sexualized women.

Prints

Issues

An Eye For An Eye, Chapter 1: Sunday In The Park, November 1988
An Eye For An Eye, Chapter 1: Tie A Yellow Ribbon, December 1988
An Eye For An Eye, Chapter 1: A Dish Best Served Cold, February 1989
Sniper, March 1989
Crucible, April 1989
On The Track Of Unknown Animals, June 1989
Endangered Species, July 1989
Damage, September 1989
Guilt Trip, October 1989
Second Shot, November 1989
Shock Treatment, Mid November 1989
Acts Of Vengeance: Contrast In Sin, December 1989
Acts Of Vengeance: Confession, Mid December 1989
Blind Faith, January 1990
Headlines!, February 1990
Panhandle, March 1990
Tropical Trouble, April 1990
Kahuna, May 1990
Trauma In Paradise!, June 1990
The Debt, July 1990
Deep Water, August 1990
Snowstorm, September 1990
Firepower Among The Ruins, part 1, October 1990
Firepower Among The Ruins, part 2, November 1990
The Sicilian Saga, part 1: Get Out Of Town, December 1990
The Sicilian Saga, part 2: Cry Uncle, January 1991
The Sicilian Saga, part 3: Saracen With The Clock!, February 1991
Meat, March 1991
Crash And Burn, April 1991
Spin Cycle, May 1991
The Kamchatkan Konspiracy, part 1: Pipeline, June 1991
The Kamchatkan Konspiracy, part 2: Blowout, July 1991
The Kamchatkan Konspiracy, part 3: Fire In The Hole, August 1991
Blackout, September 1991
Motivation, October 1991
Let Them Eat Cake, November 1991
Controversy, December 1991
Terminal Velocity, January 1992
Slay Ride, February 1992
Good Money After Bad, March 1992
Armageddon Express, April 1992
Ten-To-One, May 1992
Adirondack Haunts, June 1992
Barbarians, July 1992
Dead Man's Hand, part 3: The Vegas Idea, August 1992
Dead Man's Hand, part 6: Hot Chrome And Cold Blood, September 1992
Dead Man's Hand, part 9: Say Goodbye To Vegas, October 1992
Walk Through Fire, part 1: Backs To The Wall, November 1992
Walk Through Fire, part 2: A Gunfight, December 1992
Unfriendly Skies, January 1993
Walk Through Fire, part 3: Sidewinder, February 1993
Heart of Ice, March 1993
Heart Of Stone, April 1993
Surface Thrill, May 1993
Bad Boyz, June 1993
24 Hours Of Power!, July 1993
Blood Money, August 1993
Blood Red Moon, September 1993
The House That Hate Built, October 1993
Dogged, November 1993
 Part of Suicide Run, December 1993
Suicide Run, part 4: Standing In The Shadows, January 1994
Suicide Run, part 7: Known Associates, February 1994
 Part of Suicide Run, March 1994
Pariah!, April 1994
Pariah, Part 2: Last Exit, May 1994
Pariah, part 3: Nailed, June 1994
Pariah, part 4: Bad Turn, July 1994
Pariah, The Conclusion: Strict Time!, August 1994
Last Entry, prelude: Warm Bodies, September 1994
Last Entry, part 1: Road To Death!, October 1994
Last Entry, part 2: Truck Stop Women!, November 1994
Last Entry, part 3: A Journal Of The Plague Years!, December 1994
Last Entry, part 4: Deadstop!, January 1995
Last Entry, part 5: Conclusion!, February 1995
Stone Dead, March 1995
Bound By Blood, April 1995
One Wicked Day, May 1995
Countdown: 3: House Of The Dead, June 1995
Countdown: 0: The Last Bad Man, July 1995

Collected editions

See also
 1988 in comics
 1995 in comics

References

External links
 The Punisher War Journal at the Comic Book DB

1988 comics debuts
1995 comics endings
Comics set in New York City
Punisher titles